Verne is an unincorporated community in Harrison Township, Knox County, Indiana.

A post office was established at Verne in 1892, and remained in operation until it was discontinued in 1907.

References 

Unincorporated communities in Knox County, Indiana
Unincorporated communities in Indiana